Herminiimonas fonticola is the type species of the bacterial genus Herminiimonas. It was first recovered from the borehole of bottled mineral water in Eastern Portugal.

References

External links
Type strain of Herminiimonas fonticola at BacDive -  the Bacterial Diversity Metadatabase

Burkholderiales
Bacteria described in 2005